Irene Patricia Murphy Keeley (born January 17, 1944) is a senior United States district judge of the United States District Court for the Northern District of West Virginia.

Education and career

Born in Brooklyn, New York, Keeley received a Bachelor of Arts degree from College of Notre Dame of Maryland in 1965, a Master of Arts from West Virginia University in 1977, and a Juris Doctor from West Virginia University College of Law in 1980. She was in private practice in Clarksburg, West Virginia from 1980 to 1992, and was an adjunct professor of law at the West Virginia University College of Law from 1990 to 1991.

Federal judicial service

On April 1, 1992, Keeley was nominated by President George H. W. Bush to a new seat on the United States District Court for the Northern District of West Virginia created by 104 Stat. 5089. She was confirmed by the United States Senate on August 11, 1992, and received her commission on August 12, 1992. She served as Chief Judge from 2001 to 2008. She assumed senior status on August 12, 2017.

References

Sources
 

1944 births
Living people
West Virginia University alumni
West Virginia University College of Law faculty
West Virginia University College of Law alumni
Judges of the United States District Court for the Northern District of West Virginia
United States district court judges appointed by George H. W. Bush
20th-century American judges
Lawyers from Clarksburg, West Virginia
West Virginia lawyers
People from Brooklyn
Notre Dame of Maryland University alumni
21st-century American judges